Gręboszów may refer to the following places:
Gręboszów, Lesser Poland Voivodeship (south Poland)
Gręboszów, Łódź Voivodeship (central Poland)
Gręboszów, Opole Voivodeship (south-west Poland)